The 1971–72 English Hockey League season took place from September 1971 until April 1972.

The principal event was the inaugural Men's Cup (National Clubs Championship) which was won by Hounslow.

The vast majority of the season consisted of regional leagues. The first National League tournament (The National Inter League Championship) would not be introduced until September 1975.

Men's Cup (Benson & Hedges National Clubs Championship)

National Rounds (Quarter-finals)

National Rounds (Semi-finals)

Final
(Held at Crystal Palace on 16 April)

References

1971-72
field hockey
field hockey
1971 in field hockey
1972 in field hockey